Acacia covenyi is a rare plant from Southern New South Wales. Known as blue bush, the leaves have a distinct blue tinge.

External links
Flora of New South Wales Online: Acacia covenyi

covenyi
Flora of New South Wales